The flag of the Republic of Sakha (Yakutia) (  Saqa Öröspüübülüketin Bılaağa), in the Russian Federation, is one of the official symbols of the Sakha Republic, alongside the coat of arms and the national anthem of the Sakha Republic. The flag has four horizontal stripes. From top to bottom, the stripes are light blue (3/4 of the flag's width), white (1/16), red (1/16), and green (1/8). The flag has been used officially as the flag of the Sakha Republic since 14 October 1992.  The light blue stripe is charged with a white disc in the center.  The diameter of the disc is 2/5 of the flag's width.

Prior to 1992, the Sakha Republic existed as the Yakut Autonomous Soviet Socialist Republic. Prior to 1937, Yakut ASSR used a flag with a blue canton containing the depiction of the Aurora and the name of the ASSR. After 1937, the flag of the Yakut ASSR was identical to the flag of the Russian SFSR.

Symbolism 
The disc represents the northern sun. The light blue, white, and green colors stand for the sky, snow, and taiga landscape respectively. The red symbolizes the courage and constancy of the people. According to the constitution of the Sakha Republic, the white disc represents the white sun of the arctic sky while the combination of light blue, white and red represent Sakha's place in the Russian Federation.

Legislation 
The current law regulating the design and use of the flag was passed on 15 July 2004. The third chapter of Law No. 313-III "On the Official Symbols of the Sakha (Yakut) Republic" describes the symbolism, usage, placement, and the custom of flying the flag of the Sakha Republic alongside other flags.

History

Revolt flags 
Before and after the civil war, there were several revolts in the Yakut region. The revolts mainly uses tricolor flags. 
 The first Yakut Revolt uses a black-white-red tricolor. The flag is the same as the flag of the German Empire. 
 The Tungus Revolt, which established the Tungus Republic, uses a white-green-black tricolor. The white color of the flag symbolized the Siberian snow, green symbolizes wood and taiga, and black symbolizes the ground. The flag is identical to the flag of the Ural Republic.

As the Yakut ASSR 

The first flag of the Yakut ASSR was described in the 1926 Constitution of the Yakut ASSR, which was approved on the 4th All-Yakutsk Congress of Soviets on 13 February 1926, and was introduced by resolution of the 2nd session of the Yakut Central Executive Committee on the 4th convocation of 17 September 1926. The flag was a red flag, with a blue canton in the top left of the flag on which the northern lights was depicted with the inscription in golden letters "ЯАССР" in the Yakut language.

The flag of the Yakut ASSR was described in the 1937 Constitution of the Yakut ASSR, which was adopted by the Central Executive Committee of the Yakut ASSR on 9 March 1937, at the 9th Extraordinary Congress of Soviets of the Yakut ASSR. The flag was the same with the flag of the Russian SFSR. The only difference was some additional inscriptions. These inscriptions changed after a new alphabet for the Yakut language was approved by a decree of the People's Commissar of Education of the Soviet Union.

A new state flag of the Yakut ASSR was adopted on 12 June 1954, by the decree of the Presidium of the Supreme Council of the Yakut ASSR "On the State Flag of the Yakut Autonomous Soviet Socialist Republic", and the official design of the flag was approved by the Law of the Yakut ASSR of 23 June 1954. The new state flag was identical with the state flag of the Russian SFSR, but with additional inscriptions. The position of the inscriptions changed after the adoption of the new constitution of the Yakut ASSR on 31 May 1978.

As the Sakha (Yakut) Republic 
In line with the dissolution of the Soviet Union and the formation of new national entities, the Sakha Republic adopted a new constitution on 4 April 1992. There wasn't any statements regarding to the detail of the flag of the Sakha Republic on the constitution. The only statement was:

The flag of the Republic of Sakha itself was approved on 14 October 1992, by the Decree No.1158-XII, and the decree itself was adopted by the Decree No.1159-XII. At 17.50 on the same day, the flag was first hoisted over the building of the Supreme Council of the Sakha Republic, next to the flag of the Russian Federation.

The description of the flag was approved and the description of the flag was inserted into the Constitution of the Sakha Republic by the amendments of 22 July 2008.

Designers  
 Lyudmila, Danilova Sleptsova (born 1942). Painter, Honored Artist of the Sakha Republic. Member of the Union of Artists of the Russian Federation.
 Starostin, Mikhail Gavrilovich (born 1959). Graphic designer. Member of the Union of Artists of the Russian Federation.
 Zakharova, Ayina Petrovna (born 1973). Painter, student of the Artist School of Yakutia.

See also 

 List of Sakha flags

References

Citations

Bibliography

Constitutions

Books 
 
 

Flag
Flags introduced in 1992
Sakha
Sakha
Flags of the federal subjects of Russia